Omar Refaat was a professional squash player who represented Egypt. He reached a career-high world ranking of World No. 116 in April 2003.

References

External links 

Egyptian male squash players
Living people
Year of birth missing (living people)
21st-century Egyptian people